Dhudharukot is a village in Achham District in the Seti Zone of western Nepal. At the time of the 1991 Nepal census, the village had a population of 2778 living in 601 houses. By the time of the 2001 Nepal census, the population had grown to 3211, of whom 40% were literate.

References

Populated places in Achham District
Village development committees in Achham District